Sycamore Canyon Wilderness is a 56,000-acre (22,662 ha) wilderness area in the Coconino, Kaibab and Prescott national forests in the U.S. state of Arizona. Encompassing Sycamore Canyon and its surrounds from south of Williams to the confluence of Sycamore Creek with the Verde River, the wilderness is about 40 miles (64 km) southwest of Flagstaff. The canyon is one of several in Arizona that cut through the Mogollon Rim. Relevant United States Geological Survey (USGS) map quadrangles are Davenport Hill, White Horse Lake, May Tank Pocket, Perkinsville, Sycamore Basin, and Clarkdale. Red Rock-Secret Mountain Wilderness borders Sycamore Canyon Wilderness on the east.

Ring-tailed cats, black bears, mountain lions, elk, deer, rattlesnakes, scorpions, canyon wrens, hermit thrushes, and many other creatures frequent the wilderness. Vegetation, which varies with elevation and the availability of water, includes stands of pine, fir, sycamore, walnut, and cottonwood. The canyon walls include exposures of red sandstone, white limestone, and brown lava. Parts of the wilderness are open for dispersed camping; many trails are open for horseback riding as well as hiking.

Trails
A group of trails—Kelsey, Dorsey, Winter Cabin, Little Lo, and Hog Hill—with a combined length of  wind through the upper parts of the wilderness. The longest of these is Kelsey Trail, which descends through a forest of ponderosa pine, Gambel oak, and juniper into chaparral at lower elevations.

The upper-canyon group of trails intersect with others further downstream. Among these is the  Taylor Cabin Trail, which leads to a cabin formerly used by cowboys who grazed cattle in the canyon. The cabin is listed on the National Register of Historic Places. It may also be approached from downstream along the Sycamore Basin Trail, which intersects other trails such as the Dogie Trail that descends about  into the canyon from Sycamore Pass, northwest of Sedona.

Sycamore Rim Trail is an  loop in the Kaibab National Forest. Much of the trail passes through ponderosa pine forests; in other places the path crosses meadows or traverses mesas with desert plants like agave. The southern part of the loop follows the rim of the canyon along the northern boundary of the wilderness. The sections of trail outside of the wilderness are open to mountain biking as well as hiking.

Vegetation varies from cottonwoods to mesquite and includes plants such as columbine and watercress near seeps. Colorful rock formations, some bearing caves, form the canyon walls. The perennial flow of water in this part of the creek provides habitat for wildlife that includes otters and great blue herons. Camping is prohibited in the wilderness downstream of Parson Spring.

See also
 Sycamore Canyon (Yavapai County, Arizona)
 List of Arizona Wilderness Areas
 List of U.S. Wilderness Areas
 Wilderness Act

References

External links
 

Protected areas of Coconino County, Arizona
Protected areas of Yavapai County, Arizona
Wilderness areas of Arizona
Prescott National Forest
Kaibab National Forest
Coconino National Forest
Protected areas established in 1972
1972 establishments in Arizona